Platypnea–orthodeoxia syndrome is a condition in which a person has shortness of breath and low oxygen saturations when upright (platypnea and orthodeoxia), but no symptoms when lying down. It can be caused by ventilation-perfusion mismatch, intracardiac shunting, or pulmonary shunting. In some cases, the cause is multifactorial.

Although the mechanism is still unclear, it is thought to be caused by right to left shunting of blood flow due to an anatomic defect allowing communication between right and left-sided circulation, such as an atrial septal defect, patent foramen ovale, or pulmonary atrioventricular malformations, and a functional component that causes blood to move through the shunt, such as Ebstein's Anomaly, pulmonary hypertension, or absent superior vena cava.

References 

Breathing abnormalities